Alan Edward Teulon ARICS MBE was born in Enfield in 1934, one of the eighth generation descended from Antoine Teulon, a Huguenot refugee from the south of France who came to England and settled in Greenwich in 1689. He is a great great great nephew of architect Samuel Sanders Teulon.

Biography
Training as a chartered surveyor and working as a land surveyor in Jamaica for 9 years, he became a planning officer in South Wales and then was Head of Countryside Services in Northamptonshire for 25 years, developing the Pocket Parks initiative in 1984 which was subsequently supported nationally by the Countryside Commission. He was awarded the MBE in the 2000 New Year Honours for services to the Millennium Greens Initiative and to Countryside Management in Northamptonshire.
He was a member of the Dave Burman Jazz Group which played at the 1956 Sopot Jazz Festival in Poland, a revival of Polish jazz culture that began at the height of the Cold War.

Publications
The life and work of Samuel Sanders Teulon Victorian architect (2009)
Victorian Thorney: The Remodelling of a Fenland Village (2001) Jema Publications 
Organising countryside events (1991) Countryside Commission, Great Britain

References

Members of the Order of the British Empire
Chartered Surveyors
English surveyors
Living people
Year of birth missing (living people)